is a 1957 Japanese black-and-white film directed by Teruo Ishii at Shintoho during the time he was filming the Super Giant series.

Cast
 Ken Utsui: Kōji Nishimura
 Yōko Mihara: Betty Momozono
 Utako Mitsuya: 水町かほる
 Reiko Kita: 浜野千鳥
 Shigeru Amachi: 天野
 Teruo Wakatsuki: 若林
 Mitsuhiko Ōe: 徳島
 Shigeru Ogura: ハチノキ
 Shinsuke Mikimoto: 森元
 Kōtarō Sugiyama: 野村
 Shōzaburo Tachi: 黒井
 Yutaka Maki: 港湾事務所員
 Kyōko Yashiro: 荒川運輸女事務員
 Junko Arita: 悦子 (Stripper)
 Masami Akimoto: Masami (Stripper)
 Masako Yoshida: Champu (Stripper)
 Kayo Negishi: 明美 (Stripper)
 Kyōko Mishima: 簡易旅館天口の女将
 Masaru Kodaka: ホルモン焼の男

References

External links
 
 
  
 
 

1957 films
Japanese black-and-white films
Films directed by Teruo Ishii
1950s Japanese-language films
Shintoho films
1950s Japanese films